This is a list of stereoscopic video games. The following article is the list of notable stereoscopic 3D games and related productions and the platforms they can run on. Additionally, many PC games are supported or are unsupported but capable 3D graphics with AMD HD3D, DDD TriDef, Nvidia 3D Vision, 3DGM, and more.

See also
List of Nvidia 3D Vision Ready games
List of Nintendo 3DS games
List of 3D PlayStation 3 games
List of PlayStation 4 games with 3D support
List of Wii U games
List of Xbox 360 games with 3D support
3D film
Vectrex
Disney Digital 3-D
Dolby 3D
Nintendo 3DS
RealD Cinema
Stereoscopy
TDVision
Virtual Boy
Jaguar VR

References

 
S